Addictive Nature (foaled 2014 at Little Avondale Stud) is an Australian Thoroughbred racehorse, sired by Savabeel from the mare Generous Nature.

Background
Ultra Thoroughbred Racing purchased Addictive Nature for a record $775,000 NZ at the New Zealand Bloodstock Ready to Run sale in 2016. At the time, the purchase price was a record equaling sale for his sire Savabeel, with Sean Buckley and Ultra Thoroughbred Racing’s bloodstock veterinarian Dr. Toby Koenig making the winning bid of $775,000 NZD for the colt following a heated contest.

Addictive Nature is a full brother to Savvy Nature, who recently returned from a successful career in Hong Kong to the stable of Gai Waterhouse and Adrian Bott at Randwick.

Savvy Nature has managed to win five races during his career, with his most significant win to date in the Mitchelton Wines Vase at Moonee Valley (2040m Group 2) on 26 October 2013, taking home the $235,000 for first place.

Racing History 
He won his debut race which was the Pluck at Vinery Handicap (1100m) at Warwick Farm Racecourse on 19 July 2017, taking prize money of $22,000.

He won at 1:03.66, breaking the previous class record held by multiple Group I-winner Eremein by 0.17 seconds.

Pedigree

References

Racehorses bred in Australia
Racehorses trained in Australia
2014 racehorse births
Thoroughbred family 9